The Ministry of Higher Education and Scientific Research (MHESR) is a ministry of the Tunisian government. Its head office is in Tunis.

References

External links

 Ministry of Higher Education and Scientific Research
 Ministry of Higher Education and Scientific Research 

Higher Education and Scientific Research
Tunisia, Higher Education and Scientific Research